Gábor Bodó (5 August 1941 – 8 July 2011) was Hungarian volleyball player who competed in 1964 Summer Olympics.

References 

1941 births
2011 deaths
Hungarian men's volleyball players
Volleyball players at the 1964 Summer Olympics
Olympic volleyball players of Hungary
People from Balatonfüred
Sportspeople from Veszprém County